was the founder of Shotokan karate-do, perhaps the most widely known style of karate, and is known as a "father of modern karate". Following the teachings of Anko Itosu and Anko Asato, he was one of the Okinawan karate masters who introduced karate to the Japanese mainland in 1922, following its earlier introduction by his teacher Itosu. He taught karate at various Japanese universities and became honorary head of the Japan Karate Association upon its establishment in 1949.

Early life
Gichin Funakoshi was born on November 10, 1868, the year of the Meiji Restoration, in Shuri, Okinawa, to a Ryūkyūan Pechin. Funakoshi was born prematurely. His father's name was Gisu. After entering primary school he became close friends with the son of Ankō Asato, a karate and Jigen-ryū master who would soon become his first karate teacher. 
−	
Funakoshi's family was stiffly opposed to the Meiji government's abolition of the Japanese topknot, and this meant that he would be ineligible to pursue his goal of attending medical school (where topknots were banned), despite having passed the entrance examination. Being trained in both classical Chinese and Japanese philosophies and teachings, Funakoshi became an assistant teacher in Okinawa. During this time, his relations with the Asato family grew and he began nightly travels to the Asato family residence to receive karate instruction from Ankō Asato.

Shotokan Karate

Funakoshi had trained in both of the popular styles of Okinawan karate of the time: Shōrei-ryū and Shōrin-ryū. Shotokan is named after Funakoshi's pen name, Shōtō (松濤), which means "waving pines".  Kan means training hall or house, thus Shōtōkan (松濤館) referred to the "house of Shōtō". This name was coined by Funakoshi's students when they posted a sign above the entrance of the hall at which Funakoshi taught. In addition to being a karate master, Funakoshi was an avid poet and philosopher who would reportedly go for long walks in the forest where he would meditate and write his poetry.

By the late 1910s, Funakoshi had many students, of which a few were deemed capable of passing on their master's teachings. Continuing his effort to garner widespread interest in Okinawan karate, Funakoshi ventured to mainland Japan in 1917, and again in 1922. In 1922 Funakoshi (aged 53) and Makoto Gima (aged 26) were invited to the Kodokan by Judo Master Jigoro Kano to perform a karate demonstration. It was this demonstration that inevitably made karate popular in the mainland.

In 1930, Funakoshi established an association named Dai-Nihon Karate-do Kenkyukai to promote communication and information exchange among people who study karate-dō. In 1936, Dai-Nippon Karate-do Kenkyukai changed its name to Dai-Nippon Karate-do Shoto-kai. The association is known today as Shotokai, and is the official keeper of Funakoshi's karate heritage.

In 1936, Funakoshi built the first Shōtōkan dojo (training hall) in Tokyo. While on the Japanese mainland, he changed the written characters  of karate to mean "empty hand" (空手) instead of "China hand" (唐手) (literally Tang dynasty) to downplay its connection to Chinese boxing. Karate had borrowed many aspects from Chinese boxing.  Funakoshi also argued in his autobiography that a philosophical evaluation of the use of "empty" seemed to fit as it implied a way which was not tethered to any other physical object.

Funakoshi's re-interpretation of the character kara in karate to mean "empty" (空) rather than "Chinese" (唐)  caused some tension with traditionalists back in Okinawa, prompting Funakoshi to remain in Tokyo indefinitely. In 1949 Funakoshi's students created the Japan Karate Association (JKA), with Funakoshi as the honorary head of the organization. However, in practise this organization was led by Masatoshi Nakayama. The JKA began formalizing Funakoshi's teachings.

Illness and death
Funakoshi developed osteoarthritis in 1948, and died on April 26, 1957.

Legacy
Funakoshi published several books on karate including his autobiography, Karate-Do: My Way of Life. His legacy, however, rests in a document containing his philosophies of karate training now referred to as the niju kun, or "twenty principles".  These rules are the premise of training for all Shotokan practitioners and are published in a work titled The Twenty Guiding Principles of Karate. Within this book, Funakoshi lays out 20 rules by which students of karate are urged to abide in an effort to "become better human beings". Funakoshi's Karate-Do Kyohan "The Master Text" remains his most detailed publication, containing sections on history, basics, kata, and kumite. The famous Shotokan Tiger by Hoan adorns the hardback cover.

Memorial

A memorial to Gichin Funakoshi was erected by the Shotokai at Engaku-ji, a temple in Kamakura, on December 1, 1968. Designed by Kenji Ogata the monument features calligraphy by Funakoshi and Sōgen Asahina (1891–1979), chief priest of the temple which reads Karate ni sente nashi (There is no first attack in karate), the second of Funakoshi's Twenty Precepts.  To the right of Funakoshi's precept is a copy of the poem he wrote on his way to Japan in 1922.

A second stone features an inscription by Nobuhide Ohama and reads:

Publications

Funakoshi, Gichin: Introduction to Karate, Translated by Henning Wittwer, 2023. .

See also
 List of Shotokan organizations

References

 

1868 births
1957 deaths
Martial arts school founders
Martial arts writers
Okinawan male karateka
Shotokan practitioners